Captain Khalilur Rehman (  b. 5 May 1934) , best known as Commander Khalil, is a retired naval officer in the Pakistan Navy who served as the Governor of Khyber-Pakhtunkhwa, appointed in 2005 until being replaced in 2006.

In addition, he also commanded the Royal Bahrain Naval Force from 1976 until retiring from his military service in 1988 to pursue career in the politics.

Biography
Khalilur Rehman was born in a Surezai, a small village, located in the vicinity of the Peshawar District, North-West Frontier Province in India on 5 May 1934. He was educated at the Edwardes College before joining the Pakistan Navy in 1954. He is of Hindkowan background.

He did his initial military training at the Royal Naval College in Greenwich, England, where he secured his BSc in Communications. In 1963–67, Lieutenant Khalil served in the Ayub administration as a staff officer.

He served in the second war with India in 1965, and in third war with India in 1971 where he served on the destroyer as an executive officer. In 1973, Commander Khalil commanded the PNS Alamgir until 1976 when he was selected to assume the command of the Royal Bahrain Naval Force, which Captain Khalil commanded until 1988. In addition, he went to attend the Naval War College in Lahore.
In 1988, Capt. Khalil served in the faculty of the Naval War College but later resigned from his commission when he decided to play a role in national politics, and surprised many when he won the elections for the Senate of Pakistan which he served until 2006 as an Independent.

Governor of Khyber-Pakhtunkhwa (2005-2006)

On 13 March 2005, Khalil was appointed as the 25th Governor of Khyber Pakhtunkhwa by then-President Pervez Musharraf when Lt-Gen. Iftikhar Hussain tendered his resignation.

However, his tenureship was cut short when President Musharraf decided to replace him with his loyal officer, Lt-Gen. Ali Jan Aurakzai. It was reportedly widely that Khalil had found it difficult to run province with an increasingly assertive military and 80,000 troops in the tribal region On 23 May 2006, Khalil was eventually replaced by Lt-Gen. Ali Jan Aurakzai and retired from the politics.

See also
Pakistan

References

External links
NWFP Governor Khalil being replaced

1934 births
Hindkowan people
People from Peshawar
Edwardes College alumni
Graduates of the Royal Naval College, Greenwich
Pakistan Navy officers
Pakistani military personnel of the Indo-Pakistani War of 1971
Pakistan Naval War College alumni
Pakistani expatriates in Bahrain
Members of the Senate of Pakistan
Governors of Khyber Pakhtunkhwa
Living people
Deputy chairmen of the Senate of Pakistan